Aerie Faerie Nonsense is The Enid's second album. It was released in 1977 by EMI and later re-released by The Enid in 1983 following its deletion from the EMI catalogue.

Release
Aerie Faerie Nonsense was recorded at Morgan Studios between August and September 1977 and released that year on EMI Records. EMI deleted it from their catalogue soon after.

In 1983, frustrated by the unavailability of the album, The Enid reconstructed it so that they could re-release it by themselves. They re-recorded all the tracks except Ondine. It was released on Vinyl LP with slightly altered track names and the poem "To Sleep" by John Keats featured on the album cover.
In 1985 Robert John Godfrey and Stephen Stewart recorded an extended version of Fand that was released for the fan club. This extended version appears on CD releases of the reconstructed Aerie Farie Nonsense.

In June 2010, following the Inner Sanctum releases, EMI agreed to grant an Exclusive Worldwide License for the original EMI release of the album to Operation Seraphim. The album was subsequently transferred from the original 30IPS 1/4 inch Dolby A tapes to 96 kHz 24 bit digital by Christian Curtis at Abbey Road. The tracks were mastered for CD by Max Read at The Lodge Recording Studio. The CD Artwork was taken from the original releases and incorporated into an eight-page booklet. The album was released on 15 July 2010 and made available from The Enid’s online shop.

Track listing

Original 1977 Version

Side one
 "Prelude" (Godfrey) – (1:20) 
 "Mayday Galliard" (Godfrey) – (6:09) 
 "Ondine" (Godfrey, Lickerish) – (4:01)
 "Childe Roland" (Godfrey, Lickerish) – (7:09)

Side two
 "Fand I" (Godfrey, Lickerish) – (11:46)
 "Fand II" (Godfrey) – (5:41)

1983 Re-Issue

Side one
 A Heroe's Life "Childe Roland to the Dark Tower Came" (Godfrey, Lickerish, Steward) – (7:09)
 Ondine "Dear sweet thing of wonderful beauty, Roland's childe" (Godfrey) – (3:47)
 Interlude (Godfrey) – (1:00)
 Bridal Dance "Mayday Galliard" (Godfrey) – (6:39)

Side two
 Fand
 1st Movement
 Isle Of Brooding Solitude (Godfrey) – (2:51)
 The Silver Ship – Landfall (Godfrey, Lickerish, Stewart) – (5:02)
 The Grand Loving (Robert John Godfrey, Lickerish, Stewart) – (9:37)
 2nd Movement
 Love/Death...The Immolation of Fand (Godfrey) – (12:09)

Personnel
 Robert John Godfrey - keyboards
 Stephen Stewart - guitars, bass
 Francis Lickerish - guitars
 Charlie Elston - keyboards
 Terry "Thunderbags" Pack - bass
 Dave Storey - drums, percussion
 Dave Hancock - trumpet

1983 version
 Glen Tollet - bass
 Chris North - drums, percussion

Additional personnel
 Angus Boucher - executive producer
 John Sinclair - producer
 Gary Lyons - engineer
 Dean Pywell - sleeve design
 Colin Dunbar - original concept

References

1977 albums
The Enid albums
EMI Records albums